The Nazrul Institute is Bangladesh's national institute, established in February 1985. Its headquarters are located in Kabi Bhaban in Dhanmondi, Dhaka, Bangladesh. It fulfills a number of roles; promoting the literary work of the poet Kazi Nazrul Islam, recognising excellence in literature research by conferring awards, and public engagement.

Structure and governance
The institute is headed by an executive director who has a trustee board to advise them. The first executive director of the institute was Mohammad Mahfuzullah and the first chairman of the trustee board was Mohammad Nasiruddin.

Functions and activities
According to the Nazrul Institute Ordinance of 12 June 1984, the functions and objectives of the institute regarding the poet are:
 Conduct study and research on the writings
 Compile, preserve, edit and publish poems and songs
 Organise discussion meetings, lectures, seminars, conferences
 Run a library containing books on the poet's life, literature, music, records of his songs, tapes, films
 Prepare musical notations and make gramophone records, tape records, films
 Impart training in singing and reciting songs
 Confer awards to scholars for outstanding research

The institute has preserved around 1,500 authentic Nazrul Geeti songs.

Nazrul Award
Since 1985, the institute has been conferring two awards each year to dedicated Nazrul artistes and researchers. A partial list of the winners are:
 2007 – Ismat Ara and Mohammad Abdul Quayum
 2009 – Razia Sultana and Shaheen Samad
 2012 – Anupam Hayat and MA Mannan
 2013 –  Khilkhil Kazi and Nashid Kamal
 2014 – Serajul Islam Choudhury and Shabnam Mustari
 2015 – Sadya Afreen Mallick and Abu Hena Abdul Awal
 2016 – Fatema Tuz Zohra, Ferdous Ara and Leena Taposh Khan
 2017 – Khairul Anam Shakil and Rashidun Nabi

References

Dhanmondi
Learned societies of Bangladesh
Cultural organisations based in Bangladesh
Bengali literary institutions
Cultural promotion organizations
1985 establishments in Bangladesh
Kazi Nazrul Islam